Vicência is a city in the state of Pernambuco, Brazil. It is 81 km away from the state capital Recife. It has an estimated (IBGE 2020) population of 32,772 inhabitants.

Geography

 State - Pernambuco
 Region - Zona da mata Pernambucana
 Boundaries - Timbaúba and Macaparana   (N);  Limoeiro and Buenos Aires    (S);  Aliança  (E); Bom Jardim and São Vicente Ferrer   (W)
 Area - 230.82 km2
 Elevation - 119 m
 Hydrography - Goiana River
 Vegetation - Subcaducifólia forest
 Climate - Hot tropical and humid
 Annual average temperature - 25.3 c
 Distance to Recife - 81 km

Economy
The main economic activities in Vicência are based in food & beverage industry and agribusiness, especially sugarcane, bananas; and livestock such as cattle and poultry.

Economic indicators

Economy by Sector
2006

Health indicators

References

Municipalities in Pernambuco